KJNN-LP (94.3 FM, "Radio 74") is an American low-power FM radio station licensed to serve the community of Holbrook, Arizona. The station is licensed to Holbrook Adventist Educational Radio Corp. and operated as a ministry of the Holbrook Seventh-day Adventist Indian School. It airs a Christian radio format including Christian music and Bible teaching programs. The station was assigned the KJNN-LP call letters by the Federal Communications Commission on April 28, 2004.

References

External links
 Radio 74 Internationale
 Holbrook Seventh-Day Adventist Indian School
 

JNN-LP
JNN-LP
Radio stations established in 2006
Mass media in Navajo County, Arizona
2006 establishments in Arizona
Native American radio
Holbrook, Arizona
Radio 74 Internationale radio stations